This a list of the Spanish PROMUSICAE Top 20 physical Singles number-ones of 2006.

See also 
2006 in music
List of number-one hits in Spain

References

2006 in Spanish music
Spain Singles
2006